St. Clair Winery is an American wine brand from Deming, New Mexico, founded in 1984. As of January 2020, St. Clair Winery's Mimbres Red is New Mexico's #1 selling wine and is made in the Mimbres Valley in Luna County by the Lescombes family (Lescombes Family Vineyards). The vineyard site used to produce the wine is located 50 miles west of Deming, New Mexico, just east of Lordsburg, New Mexico. It is the largest yielding vineyard in New Mexico and covers 220 acres. The company is owned and operated by Hervé Lescombes and family (sons Florent Lescombes and Emmanuel Lescombes), who have been in the wine industry for six generations, and have made wine across three continents (Algeria, Africa; Burgundy, France, Europe; New Mexico, USA, North America)

St. Clair is also known for its chile-infused wine, Hatch Chile Wines, made with Hatch peppers, for which it was awarded a  US Federal grant for value-added agricultural products in 2014.

The Lescombes family's company-owned locations were re-branded under the "D.H. Lescombes" name in Spring of 2019. Besides the D.H. Lescombes Winery & Tasting Room in Deming, there are D.H. Lescombes Winery & Bistro locations in Albuquerque, and Las Cruces, New Mexico. A location in Santa Fe, Hervé Wine Bar, was opened in 2018.

D.H. Lescombes was named after the fifth generation of the winemaking legacy, Danielle & Hervé Lescombes. A Limited Release selection of D.H. Lescombes wines are made with the finest red varietals grown in their own New Mexico vineyard. Limited Release wines are crafted in small, carefully controlled batches and committed to a two-year French oak maturation process.

St. Clair Winery's Mimbres Red became the #1 selling wine in the state of New Mexico for the first time in early 2019. It had been ranked as the best-selling red wine for many years.

Today, the St. Clair Winery brand is still Lescombes family-owned and made since 1991. It is sold at various retailers in New Mexico. The wines are distributed by National Distributing Company within the state of New Mexico.

See also

List of wineries in New Mexico
New Mexico wine

References

Further reading

External links

1984 establishments in New Mexico
Tourist attractions in Luna County, New Mexico
Wineries in New Mexico
Food and drink companies established in 1984